Septoria secalis is a fungal plant pathogen infecting rye.

Morphology & Biology 
Septoria Secalis, also known as Septoria leaf blotch, is a common disease that mainly attacks rye leaves. Small spots appear between leaf veins, elongate, then turn yellow-brown and become pale. The disease appears most often on seedling leaves during the autumn, but also affects adult plants.

Economic Impact 
Severe attacks of Septoria Secalis can result in crop yield losses between 10% and 40%. Common control measures include crop rotation, the ploughing of plant debris, and fungicidal treatment of affected plants.

References

External links

Fungal plant pathogens and diseases
Rye diseases
secalis